The following lists events that happened during 1993 in Uganda.

Incumbents
President: Yoweri Museveni 
Vice President: Samson Kisekka
Prime Minister: George Cosmas Adyebo

Events
date unknown
Kibale Forest becomes a national park.
NACWOLA (National Community of Women Living with HIV/AIDS) is founded by Beatrice Were.

Births
 January 1 - Alengot Oromait, Ugandan politician

References

 
1990s in Uganda
Years of the 20th century in Uganda
Uganda
Uganda